Georgiana Carolina Fox, 1st Baroness Holland, of Holland (27 March 1723 – 24 July 1774), known as Lady Caroline Lennox before 1744 and as Lady Caroline Fox from 1744 to 1762, was the eldest of the Lennox sisters.

Family background
The Lennox sisters were daughters of Charles Lennox, 2nd Duke of Richmond, and Sarah Cadogan. Charles Lennox was the grandson of Charles II of England through the King's relationship with Louise de Kérouaille, Duchess of Portsmouth. In 1744, Lady Caroline eloped with Henry Fox, a politician who was 18 years her senior. Though her parents disapproved of the marriage, it proved a happy one. The couple had four sons, including the Whig politician Charles James Fox and the general Henry Edward Fox.

Their home, Holland House, Kensington, became a social and political gathering place.

Passed over
Lady Caroline's favourite sister, Emily Lennox, married and went to live in Ireland in 1747. In 1750 and 1751, the Lennox sisters' parents died in quick succession, leaving three younger daughters, Louisa, Sarah, and Cecilia, aged eight, six, and one. The 2nd Duke of Richmond, in his will, remembered Lady Caroline's reckless elopement, passed over her and instructed that his three youngest daughters be entrusted to the care of their sister Emily and her husband, James FitzGerald, 20th Earl of Kildare. Lady Caroline resented this slight but hoped to redeem herself by presenting her younger sisters at court and helping them make good matches.

The Kildares' allegations that the Foxes were responsible for Lady Sarah Lennox's embarrassing rejection by the young King George III, as well as her disastrous marriage to Sir Charles Bunbury soon afterwards, provoked a quarrel between the sisters that was not healed until shortly before Lady Caroline's death.

Baroness
On 3 May 1762, Caroline was created Baroness Holland of Holland in the Peerage of Great Britain. Her husband was created Baron Holland of Foxley less than a year later, on 17 April 1763.

Caroline's two spoilt sons, especially the elder one Stephen, caused her much embarrassment and distress by gambling and falling into debt.

Illness and death
Lady Caroline was already plagued by a mysterious and painful illness when her husband, who had suffered a stroke, died on 1 July 1774. She followed him 23 days later and is buried at All Saints, Farley, Wiltshire.

In media
Aristocrats, a six-part television drama based on Stella Tillyard's biography of Caroline and her sisters, first aired on BBC One in 1999.

References

Hereditary peeresses of Great Britain created by George III
British baronesses
Daughters of British dukes
1723 births
1774 deaths
Caroline